Gò Công Đông is a rural district (huyện) of Tiền Giang province, in the Mekong Delta region of Vietnam. As of 2003 the district had a population of 191,514. The district covers an area of 358 km². The district capital lies at Tân Hòa.

References

Districts of Tiền Giang province